Damnica is a PKP railway station in Damnica, Pomeranian Voivodeship, Poland. The station is reached by PR trains from Gdynia.

Lines crossing the station

Train services
The station is served by the following services:

Regional services (R) Tczew — Słupsk  
Regional services (R) Malbork — Słupsk  
Regional services (R) Elbląg — Słupsk  
Regional services (R) Słupsk — Bydgoszcz Główna 
Regional services (R) Słupsk — Gdynia Główna

References

Railway stations in Pomeranian Voivodeship
Słupsk County